Agustín Milián Gracía (born August 28, 1958) is a former Spanish handball player who competed in the 1980 Summer Olympics and in the 1984 Summer Olympics.

In 1980 he was part of the Spanish team which finished fifth in the Olympic tournament. He played five matches and scored twelve goals.

Four years later he finished eighth with the Spanish team in the 1984 Olympic tournament. He played three matches and scored three goals.

References

1958 births
Living people
Spanish male handball players
Olympic handball players of Spain
Handball players at the 1980 Summer Olympics
Handball players at the 1984 Summer Olympics